Beyla Airport  is an airport serving the town of Beyla in the Nzérékoré Region of Guinea.

See also

Transport in Guinea
List of airports in Guinea

References

External links
 OpenStreetMap - Beyla Airport
 
 FallingRain - Beyla Airport
 Completion of Beyla Airport - pdf
 Beyla RNAV(GNSS) approach validation - pdf

Airports in Guinea